KAGI (930 AM) is a radio station licensed to Grants Pass, Oregon, United States. The station is owned by Southern Oregon University, and is an affiliate of Jefferson Public Radio, airing JPR's "News & Information" service, consisting of news and talk programming.

External links
ijpr.org

FCC History Cards for KAGI

AGI
NPR member stations
Grants Pass, Oregon
Radio stations established in 1939
1939 establishments in Oregon
Southern Oregon University